The Christian Democratic Party of Russia was a Christian Democratic political party in the Russian Federation. It was founded in May 1990.

It maintained fraternal relations with Christian Democratic parties in Europe and around the world.

Party leader Alexander Chuev was on the Unity ticket in the legislative elections in 1999 and the United Russia ticket in 2007 and was elected to the State Duma.

In 2002 the party planned to file a complaint in a Moscow court against the law on political parties which banned the creation of religious parties, following the Justice Ministry's refusal to register the party.

References

External links
Christian Democratic Party of Russia official site
1990 establishments in the Soviet Union
Christian democratic parties in Europe
Defunct political parties in Russia
Eastern Orthodox political parties
Political parties established in 1990
Political parties in the Soviet Union